Tyrolite is a hydrated calcium copper arsenate carbonate mineral with formula: CaCu5(AsO4)2CO3(OH)4·6H2O. Tyrolite forms glassy blue to green orthorhombic radial crystals and botryoidal masses. It has a Mohs hardness of 1.5 to 2 and a specific gravity of 3.1 to 3.2. It is translucent with refractive indices of nα=1.694 nβ=1.726 and nγ=1.730.

It is a secondary mineral formed by the weathering of associated copper and arsenic minerals. It was first described in 1845 for an occurrence in Schwaz, Tyrol, Austria.

References

Webmineral
Mindat with location data

Calcium minerals
Copper(II) minerals
Arsenate minerals
Monoclinic minerals
Minerals in space group 13
Minerals in space group 15